Elkhart Township is one of thirteen townships in Noble County, Indiana, United States. As of the 2010 census, its population was 2,065 and it contained 826 housing units.

Geography

Unincorporated towns
 Cosperville at 
 Wawaka at

Cemeteries
The township contains 3 cemeteries  Lower (Lauer), Cosperville, & Rice (Brothwell) Cemeteries.
The township contains Cosperville Cemetery.
The township contains Rice/Brothwell Cemetery.

Major highways
  U.S. Route 6
  Indiana State Road 9

Lakes
 Mirror Lake
 a portion of Diamond lake

School districts
 West Noble School Corporation

Political districts
 Indiana's 3rd congressional district
 State House District 52
 State Senate District 13

References
 
 United States Census Bureau 2008 TIGER/Line Shapefiles
 IndianaMap

External links
 Indiana Township Association
 United Township Association of Indiana
 City-Data.com page for Elkhart Township

Townships in Noble County, Indiana
Townships in Indiana